This is a list of notable residents and people who have origins in the Brahmanbaria District of Bangladesh. This list also includes British Bangladeshis, Bangladeshi Americans, Bangladeshi Canadians, and other non-resident Bengalis who have origins in Brahmanbaria. The people may also be known as Brahmanbarian.

Activism and cause célèbres 
Ataur Rahman Khan Khadim, physician martyred during the Bangladesh Liberation War
Dhirendranath Datta, lawyer assassinated during the Bangladesh Liberation War
Sultanuddin Ahmed, engineer martyred during the Bangladesh Liberation War
 Tarani Debnath, activist martyred in the Bengali Language Movement of the Barak Valley
Ullaskar Dutta, revolutionary

Business, economy and industry 
Abdul Monem, founder of Abdul Monem Limited
Ahmed Akbar Sobhan, founder and chairman of the Bashundhara Group
Akbar Ali Khan, economist
Fayzur Rahman, chairman of Novoair
Mohammad Ebadul Karim Bulbul, managing director of Beacon Pharmaceuticals
Obaidul Karim, Chairman, Orion Group (Bangladesh), Kohinoor Chemical
Narendra Chandra Dutta, banking pioneer of India
Salahuddin Ahmed, 9th Governor of Bangladesh Bank

Education 
Kabir Chowdhury, academic and essayist
Khan Sarwar Murshid, sixth vice-chancellor of the University of Rajshahi
M Harunur Rashid, teacher of English and Sufi writer
M Harunur Rashid, archaeologist, educationist and museum curator
Katyayanidas Bhattacharya, philosopher and academic
Momtazuddin Ahmed, philosopher and educationist

Entertainment 
Abed Hossain Khan, Bangladeshi musician, music composer and music director
Alamgir, film actor and television host
Ali Akbar Khan, classical musician
Aly Zaker, Actor
Allauddin Khan, world-renowned traditional musician
Amar Pal, Bengali folk singer and author
Arfin Rumey, Singer
Ashiqur Rahman, Actor
Ayet Ali Khan, classical musician
Bahadur Khan, sarod player and film score composer
Dolly Johur, Actress
Dhiraj Choudhury, painter
Delwar Jahan Jhantu, Film Director
Fakir Aftabuddin Khan, folk musician
Ferdous Ara, singer
Khadem Hossain Khan, classical musician
Khurshid Khan, renowned musician and sitarist of Bangladesh
Kirit Khan, classical musician
Mobarak Hossain Khan, musician
Raja Hossain Khan, music director, composer
Sabrina Porshi, Singer
Shaju Khadem, Actor
Sariful Razz, Actor
Sheikh Sadi Khan, Music composer
Syed Abdul Hadi, Singer
Subal Das, music director and composer
Rafiqul Bari Chowdhury, cinematographer and director
Zakia Bari Mamo, Actress and model
Ziaul Roshan, film actor and model

Science 
Abdus Sattar Khan, aerospace specialist, chemist and inventor
Abul Kalam Mohammed Zakaria, archaeologist 
Ahsan Ali, doctor, physician and researcher
Jahangir Alam Khan, agricultural economist and researcher
M. A. Zaher, director-general of the Geological Survey of Bangladesh
Mustafa Jabbar,

Literature 
Al Mahmud, poet and novelist
Adwaita Mallabarman, writer best known for Titash Ekti Nadir Naam
Hasnat Abdul Hye, writer and novelist
Syed Shamsul Haque, poet and novelist
Sufia Kamal, poet and activist

Journalism 
Abdul Quadir, poet, essayist and journalist
Abdul Hafiz, writer, essayist and journalist
Shah Alamgir, journalist

Military 
AB Tajul Islam, retired Bangladesh Army captain and former Minister of Liberation War Affairs
Abu Saleh Mohammad Nasim, 7th Chief of Army Staff of the Bangladesh Army
Muhammed Abul Manzur, military officer 
Shakil Ahmed, former head of Bangladesh Rifles
Sultan Shahriar Rashid Khan, army officer convicted for the assassination of Sheikh Mujibur Rahman

Monarchs and rulers 
Isa Khan, leader of the Baro-Bhuiyan chieftains of Bengal
Musa Khan, leader of the Baro-Bhuiyan chieftains of Bengal
Masum Khan, Baro-Bhuiyan zamindar
Syeda Momena Khatun, princess of Bengal Sultanate

Politics 

A. Satter, MP for Brahmanbaria-2
Abdul Khaleque, MP for Brahmanbaria-6
Abdul Latif, MP for Brahmanbaria-5
Abdul Kuddas Makhan, MP for Comilla-5
Abdus Sattar Bhuiyan, MP for Brahmanbaria-2
Abdul Rasul, nationalist leader and lawyer
Ahmed Ali, politician 
Anisul Huq, Law Minister of Bangladesh
A. T. M. Wali Ashraf, MP for Brahmanbaria-6
Bodruddoza Md. Farhad Hossain, MP for Brahmanbaria-1
Dewan Sirajul Huq, MP for Comilla-4 and one of the founding members of Bangladesh Nationalist Party
Faridul Huda, MP for Comilla-2
Ghulam Azam, former leader of Bangladesh Jamaat-e-Islami
Haroon Al Rashid, MP for Brahmanbaria-3
Humayun Kabir (politician), former Mayor of Brahmanbaria and MP of Brahmanbaria-3
Kazi Md. Anowar Hossain, MP for Brahmanbaria-5
Liaquat Ali, MP for Brahmanbaria-4
Lutful Hai Sachchu, MP for Brahmanbaria-3
Mia Abdullah Wazed, MP for Brahmanbaria-4
Mohammad Sayedul Haque, Fisheries and Livestock Minister of Bangladesh
Mohammad Shah Alam, MP for Brahmanbaria-4
Mozammel Haque, former MP for Brahmanbaria-1
Mukhlesur Rahman Chowdhury, de facto President and Prime Minister, former Adviser to Iajuddin Ahmed
Murshed Kamal, former MP for Brahmanbaria-1
Mushfiqur Rahman, MP for Brahmanbaria-4
Nurul Amin, Eighth Prime Minister of Pakistan, First Vice president of Pakistan and Chief Minister of East Pakistan
Obaidul Muktadir Chowdhury, MP for Brahmanbaria-3
Oli Ahad, politician and language activist
Rumeen Farhana, politician
Sahidur Rahman, MP for Brahmanbaria-6 
Serajul Huq, one of the founding member of the Bangladesh Awami League
Shahjahan Hawlader Sujan, former MP for Brahmanbaria-6
Shah Jikrul Ahmad, MP for Brahmanbaria-5
Sheuly Azad, female politician
Syed Shamsul Huda, Nawab of Gokarna, president of the All India Muslim League
Ziaul Haque Mridha, MP for Brahmanbaria-2

Religion 
Fazlul Haque Amini, principal of Jamia Qurania Arabia Lalbagh and politician
Sajidur Rahman, professor of Hadith at Jamia Islamia Yunusia
Anandamayi Ma, Hindu saint

Sports 
Gazi Salahuddin, cricketer for Chittagong Division cricket team
Mohammad Ashraful, former captain of Bangladesh national cricket team *[Jubaid Ahamed]France national cricket team

See also 
 Tourism in Brahmanbaria
 Economy of Brahmanbaria

References 

 01
Brahmanbaria
Brahmanbaria